Horace B. Jenkins (1941 - 1982) was an American filmmaker. He is best known for his film Cane River which was released after his death.

References

External links
 https://www.imdb.com/name/nm0420858/

1982 deaths
1941 births